The discography of The Whispers, an American rhythm and blues group, consists of thirty-two studio albums, one live album, seventy-seven singles and thirteen official compilation albums.

Studio albums

Live albums

Compilation albums

Singles

1960s

1970s

1980s

1990s

2000s-present

Notes

References

Discographies of American artists
Rhythm and blues discographies